Legion of Heroes (Spanish:Legión de héroes) is a 1942 Spanish war film directed by Juan Fortuny and Armando Seville and starring Emilio Sandoval, Matilde Nacher and Rosita Alba.

Cast
 Emilio Sandoval
 Matilde Nacher
 Rosita Alba
 Javier Rodil
 Tomás Pallás
 Luis Cortés
 Fernando Velasco
 Salvador Malonda
 La Brazalema

References

Bibliography 
 Bentley, Bernard. A Companion to Spanish Cinema. Boydell & Brewer 2008.

External links 
 

1940s war films
Spanish war films
1942 films
1940s Spanish-language films
Spanish black-and-white films
1940s Spanish films